Welcome to the Family may refer to: 
"Welcome to the Family" (song), a 2010 song by Avenged Sevenfold
Welcome to the Family (album), a 2001 compilation album from Drive-Thru Records
Welcome to the Family (American TV series), a 2013 NBC TV series
Welcome to the Family (2018 TV series), a 2018–19 TV3 series

See also
Welcome to the Family, Baby